The Earl or Mormaer of Ross was the ruler of the province of Ross in northern Scotland.

Origins and transfers
In the early Middle Ages, Ross was part of the vast earldom of Moray. It seems to have been made a separate earldom in the mid 12th century, when Malcolm MacHeth is found designated Earl of Ross. Malcolm had earlier been imprisoned at Roxburgh for rebelling against David I, but when Malcolm's brother-in-law Somerled invaded Scotland, David was forced to relent and grant the earldom unto Malcolm.

The title was later granted by William the Lion to Floris III of Holland in 1161 upon Floris's marriage to William's sister Ada of Huntingdon. However, Floris held the title only in a nominal sense, as he took no active part in the governance of Ross. The title seems not to have been passed on, for in 1291 Floris's descendant is found complaining that the earldom had been deprived from him.

The true founder was the famous Ferquhard, from the Irish Ó Beólláin (O'Beolain, Boland, Bolan) family. This Ferquhard was the son of the lay parson of the monastery of Applecross, and was hence known as MacIntagart, meaning "son of the priest". In 1215 the newly crowned Alexander II was forced to suppress a rebellion in Moray and Ross. Ferquhard sided with the king, and captured the rebel leaders, before beheading them and presenting their heads to Alexander. For this he was knighted. He was created Earl of Ross in the 1220s, probably in 1226.

The line of Ferquhard continued until the death of William, 5th Earl of Ross, in 1372. William had two daughters, the eldest of which, Euphemia, married Sir Walter Leslie, who then became jure uxoris Earl of Ross. The Leslies continued to hold the earldom until the line ended in another heiress, also named Euphemia. This Euphemia was a sickly girl, who suffered from a hunchback. Though she was nominally Countess of Ross, Ross's governance was carried out by her grandfather Robert, Duke of Albany. Her uncle Donald, Lord of the Isles, perceived her weakness, and attempted to take Ross by force, but he was defeated by Robert at the Battle of Harlaw. In 1415 Euphemia was persuaded to resign the earldom in favour of Robert and his sons. However, the Albany Stewarts would meet their downfall when King James I returned to Scotland in 1424. Robert was strongly suspected of having murdered James's brother David, and in revenge James had the entire family forfeited and executed (with the exception of James the Fat who escaped to Ireland). The earldom therefore passed to the Lords of the Isles, who continued to hold it until John forfeited it in the 1470s for trying to conquer Scotland with the help of Edward IV of England.

In 1481 James III granted the earldom unto his second son, also named James. James had already been made Marquis of Ormond at his baptism. In 1487 his earldom was raised to a dukedom, and he was granted the additional titles Earl of Ardmenach and Lord of Ardmannoch, Brechin and Navarre. James entered the clergy, and thus never married or had issue. He died in 1503, and all his titles became extinct.

The fourth creation was on 20 May 1565, for Henry, Lord Darnley, who was also created Lord Ardmannoch. Shortly thereafter he was created Duke of Albany. After his murder at Kirk o' Field, he was succeeded by his infant son James, whose accession as James VI a few months later returned the titles to the Crown.

Upon the investiture of Charles Stuart as Duke of Albany on 2 December 1600, he was also granted the Marquisate of Ormonde, the Earldom of Ross, and the Lordship of Ardmannoch. Charles's elder brother Henry died unexpectedly in 1612, and he became Prince of Wales as heir apparent to the throne. He acceded as king in 1625, and the titles again reverted to the Crown.

Ross currently has no earl, but it is possible the title will one day be revived for a member of the royal family. There was speculation that the title might be revived for Prince Harry; it was not.

List of Earls of Ross

Early mormaers/earls of Ross

Malcolm MacHeth (died 1168)
 With the crown
Ferquhar (died 1249)
William I (died 1274)
William II (died 1323)
Hugh, Earl of Ross (died 1333) (from whom descend the chiefs of Clan Ross).
William (died 1372)
Euphemia I (died )
 Married Sir Walter Leslie
Alexander Leslie (died 1402)
Euphemia II (died ) (resigned c. 1415)
John Stewart, (died 1424)
Mariota (died ) (sister of Alexander Leslie, Earl of Ross)
 m. Donald, Lord of the Isles
Alexander of Islay (died 1448)
John of Islay (died ) (forfeited 1476)

Earls of Ross, creation of 1481
James Stewart (1476–1504)

Earls of Ross, creation of 1565
Henry Stuart (1545–1567) (later Duke of Albany and King of Scotland)
James Stuart (1566–1625) (became king in 1567)

Earls of Ross, creation of 1600
Charles Stuart (1600–1649) (became king in 1625)

References

 Balfour Paul, Sir James. The Scots Peerage. Edinburgh: David Douglas, 1909. 
 Grant, Alexander. "The Province of Ross and the Kingdom of Alba" in E.J. Cowan and R. Andrew McDonald (eds.) Alba: Celtic Scotland in the Medieval Era. East Linton: Tuckwell Press, 2000. .
 McDonald, R. Andrew. "Old and New in the Far North: Ferchar Maccintsacairt and the Early Earls of Ross" in Steve Boardman and Alasdair Ross (eds.) The Exercise of Power in Medieval Scotland, c.1200–1500. Dublin: Four Courts, 2003. .
 Roberts, John L. Lost Kingdoms: Celtic Scotland in the Middle Ages. Edinburgh: Edinburgh University Press, 1997. .
 Brown, Peter, publisher, The Peerage of Scotland, Edinburgh, 1834, p. 212.

External links
Somerled & Earl of Ross
Malcolm Macbeth, the first Earl of Ross
Clan Ross

 

 
Earldoms in the Peerage of Scotland
Extinct earldoms in the Peerage of Scotland
British and Irish peerages which merged in the Crown
Noble titles created in 1157
Noble titles created in 1215
Noble titles created in 1481
Noble titles created in 1565
Noble titles created in 1600